Mutikizizi  is a ward in Bikita District of Masvingo Province in south-eastern Zimbabwe.

mutikizizi is a shopping centre in Bikita West constituency, and almost 52 km from Nyika growth point. It is a remote area that has a population of around 1011. It is a densely populated area with a very high literacy level because of its schools: Kushinga secondary, Mutikizizi, Gwariro, Nyaravani, Gudo and <arirangwe are schools in the area.

Wards of Zimbabwe
Bikita District
Populated places in Masvingo Province